My Only One may refer to:

 Iisa Pa Lamang, a Filipino television series
 My Only One (TV series), a South Korean television series

See also 
 The Only One (disambiguation)